The Book of Mars: A Combat System is a 1981 game supplement published by Image Game Company.

Gameplay
The Book of Mars: A Combat System is a combat system, a set of rules designed to be used either as a supplement for existing role-playing games or miniatures rules, or as a complete stand-alone system.

Reception
William A. Barton reviewed The Book of Mars in The Space Gamer No. 54. Barton commented that "Overall, while not extensive enough to be used as a complete RPG, The Book of Mars should serve quite well as a set of miniature rules or as a supplement for other miniature or RPG systems."

References

Role-playing game supplements introduced in 1981
Science fiction role-playing game supplements